Barnarp is a village situated in Jönköping Municipality, Jönköping County, Sweden with 724 inhabitants in 2005.

References

External links 

 barnarp.com

Populated places in Jönköping County